Lars Johan Magnus Staël von Holstein (born Johan Bjers, 5 May 1963) is a Swedish entrepreneur, venture capitalist and author who co-founded dot-com companies such as Icon Medialab and LetsBuyIt during the early dot-com boom in Sweden. He has been the CEO of the multi-level marketing company Crowd1, which has been identified as an illegal pyramid scheme in a number of countries. As of December 2020 he claims to have left Crowd1.

Early life
Staël von Holstein was born in Halmstad. He lived in Spain between the ages of 2 and 8, after which his family moved back to Sweden. After his military service he worked as a travel guide in the French and Austrian alps, and in Spain. At the age of 24 he was in a car accident and had to use a wheelchair for three months.

He returned to Sweden, and studied information technology at Lund University for a time. In 1989, he began his studies at Stockholm Business School, Stockholm University, majoring in marketing management. In an interview in 2012, he claimed that he had bribed his way into Stockholm Business School.

He is married and has two children. He lives in Marbella and Madrid, Spain, and has previously lived in Holland, Thailand, Singapore, and Switzerland.

Career
Staël von Holstein began his career at the media and investment company Kinnevik, working for Jan Stenbeck for several years. He was the marketing director of Kinnevik's TV channel Z-TV, and then became the CEO of the start-up teletext company InTV (Interactive television). Staël von Holstein was vice president of Inlux, in Luxemburg, and then went on to become responsible for Banque Invik's sales and credit card operations.

At the end of 1995, Staël von Holstein left Kinnevik to found the web design company Icon Medialab together with Jesper Jos Olsson, Erik Wickström, and Magnus Lindahl. In 1998 he was included on a list of 12 "Global Leaders of Tomorrow" published by Chief Executive magazine.

He moved back to Stockholm in 2004 to start the business incubator IQube.

He was an independent, right-wing columnist for the Stockholm edition of the newspaper Metro until 2008.

Entrepreneurship

Icon Media Lab
At the end of 1995, Staël von Holstein left the Kinnevik Group to found Icon Medialab together with Jesper Jos Olsson, Erik Wickström, and Magnus Lindahl.[6]. 
The company went public in 1999 and continued rapid expansion with a US$70 million investment into the Asian market in 2000. At its peak the company had over 3,000 employees in 32 offices in cities around the globe. In 2001 its shares plunged more than 98% from their early 2000 peak and it axed around 500 jobs. In December 2001 shares of the debt-ridden company were suspended from the Stockholm stock exchange. The company was merged with rival Dutch web company Lost Boys in a reverse takeover to form a new Dutch-based company under CEO Rens Buchwaldt, and re-capitalized through a £12.4 million rights issue.

LetsBuyIt.com 
In 1998 Staël von Holstein founded LetsBuyIt, an online price comparison platform that enabled its users to share, compare, and buy various products.  LetsBuyIt floated on Germany's Neuer Markt in July 2000, raising about US$60 million from a planned target of US$180 million in its initial public offering. It sought protection under the Dutch Bankruptcy Code (Faillissementswet) in December of the same year. After deferring bankruptcy through 2001, on 4 March 2002 it declared bankruptcy. Its staff had been reduced from 450 to 25.

IQube
In 2004, Staël von Holstein started IQube, which quickly grew into one of the largest private incubators in Europe with a portfolio of more than 100 companies, but by 2009 IQube was wound-up, with Staël von Holstein's entire scheme described as "a fraud".

MyCube
Staël von Holstein founded MyCube in 2008, a digital life management tool for exchanging, sharing and selling content. MyCube was the first decentralized social exchange that prioritized privacy, ownership, and user freedom to monetize on their own creativity in contrast to centralized networks as Facebook etc. MyCube raised over US$8 million in funds in May 2011, then in August 2012 filed for voluntary liquidation.

Crowd1     
In 2019, Staël von Holstein was identified as the CEO of the multi-level marketing company Crowd1, on the company's official YouTube channel as well as in a message sent to the members of the marketing network at the end of 2019. 

In November 2019, Norway's gaming and foundation authority, Lotteri- og stiftelsestilsynet, determined that Crowd1 operates with a pyramid structure to generate revenue. In January 2020, in Burundi's largest city Bujumbura, Crowd1 was raided and over 300 people arrested, 17 of whom were placed in custody for promoting Crowd1, described as a Ponzi scheme. 

In Paraguay on 6 February 2020 the Comisión Nacional de Valores (CNV) issued a securities fraud warning against Crowd1, advising against investment. CNV identifies Crowd1 as an unregistered securities offering. Promoters of Crowd1 in Paraguay face up to three years imprisonment or a fine. On 21 February 2020 the Bank of Namibia declared Crowd1 a pyramid scheme and warned the promoters to stop their activities immediately. The bank stated  "Crowd1 does not sell tangible products or render any service of essential value, but the primary source of income for Crowd1 is the sale of membership packages to new members". 

On 12 May 2020 the Philippines Securities and Exchange Commission (SEC) directed Crowd1 Asia Pacific to immediately stop its “fraudulent” investing-taking activities. On 1 June 2020 the Gabon Ministry of the Economy and Finance warned against the activities of Crowd1, stating that "these services are akin to pyramid scam systems in network marketing in which the profit does not come from the sales activity but from the recruitment of new members. Thus, only the designers of said systems derive the benefits to the detriment of members." On 5 June 2020 the New Zealand Financial Markets Authority added Crowd1 and Impact Crowd Technology to its warning list due to concerns they may be involved in or operating a scam. 

In June 2020 Vietnam’s Competition and Consumer Protection Department issued a warning against the activities of Crowd1, stating that "these operations were likely to be pyramid schemes and were prohibited according to the established regulations". 
In July 2020 the government of Côte d’Ivoire banned Crowd1 from operation in Côte d'Ivoire, determining its sales system to be a Ponzi scheme. On 3 December 2020 Národná banka Slovenska, the central bank of the Slovak Republic, issued a securities fraud warning on the activities of Crowd1 Network Ltd and Impact Crowd Technology S.L.

In November 2020, Staël von Holstein claimed not to be the CEO of Crowd1 but of the parent company Impact Crowd Technology, as well as of Tecnología de Impacto Multiple SL which was "the sole provider of Crowd1 products".  He announced in December 2020 that he was leaving his CEO position, and ending all connections with Crowd1, for health reasons.

References

1963 births
Living people
People from Halmstad
Stockholm University alumni
Lynn University alumni
Swedish businesspeople
Swedish bloggers
Pyramid and Ponzi schemes